Time in Solomon Islands is given by Solomon Islands Time (SBT; UTC+11:00). Solomon Islands does not have an associated daylight saving time.

IANA time zone database 
The IANA time zone database gives the Solomon Islands one time zone, Pacific/Guadalcanal.

References

Time in Solomon Islands